Yan Savitskiy (born April 29, 1987 in Ridder, Kazakhstan) is a Kazakh biathlete.

He competed in the 2010 Winter Olympics for Belarus. His best finish is 18th, as a member of the Kazakh relay team. His best individual performance is 27th, in the pursuit.

As of February 2013, his best performance at the Biathlon World Championships, is 11th, in the 2013 individual.

As of February 2013, his best Biathlon World Cup finish is 14th, in the men's relay at Antholz in 2010/11. His best individual finish is 16th, in the sprint at Antholz in 2012/13. His best overall finish in the Biathlon World Cup is 70th, in 2011/12.

References 

1987 births
Living people
People from Ridder, Kazakhstan
Biathletes at the 2010 Winter Olympics
Biathletes at the 2014 Winter Olympics
Kazakhstani male biathletes
Olympic biathletes of Kazakhstan
Asian Games medalists in biathlon
Biathletes at the 2011 Asian Winter Games
Biathletes at the 2017 Asian Winter Games
Medalists at the 2011 Asian Winter Games
Medalists at the 2017 Asian Winter Games
Asian Games gold medalists for Kazakhstan
Asian Games silver medalists for Kazakhstan
21st-century Kazakhstani people